Mary P. Ryan is an American historian, and John Martin Vincent Professor of History at the Johns Hopkins University in Baltimore, Maryland. She is also Margaret Byrne Professor Emeritus of History, University of California, Berkeley.

Life
She graduated from the University of Wisconsin–Madison, and from University of California, Santa Barbara with a PhD.
She taught at Pitzer College, Binghamton University, University of California, Irvine.

Awards
 1982 Bancroft Prize
 1990 Guggenheim Fellowship

Works

"A Laudable Pride in the Whole of Us": City Halls as Civic Materialism" American Historical Review, October 2000.
"The Election Mess", The New York Review of Books, February 8, 2001

Editor

References

External links
Johns Hopkins faculty page
UC Berkeley faculty page
"Erika Kuhlman: Review of Mary P. Ryan's Mysteries of Sex: Tracing Women & Men through American History (University of North Carolina Press, 2006)", History News Network

University of Wisconsin–Madison alumni
University of California, Santa Barbara alumni
Pitzer College faculty
Binghamton University faculty
University of California, Irvine faculty
University of California, Berkeley faculty
Living people
21st-century American historians
Johns Hopkins University faculty
American women historians
21st-century American women writers
Year of birth missing (living people)
Bancroft Prize winners
Historians from California